is a Japanese professional boxer from Kobe, Hyogo, Japan. Sato became the WBA super bantamweight champion of the world when he defeated Thai champion Yoddamrong Sithyodthong in 2002 via a 8th-round knockout.

See also
List of super bantamweight boxing champions
List of WBA world champions
List of Japanese boxing world champions
Boxing in Japan

References

External links

1976 births
Boxing commentators
Living people
Japanese male boxers
Super-bantamweight boxers